The 2018 Tour de Hongrie was a road cycling stage race that took place in Hungary between 14 and 19 August 2018. It was the fourth edition of the Tour de Hongrie since its revival in 2015, and was rated as a 2.1 event as part of the 2018 UCI Europe Tour.

Route

Teams
Nineteen teams were invited to start the race. These included three UCI Professional Continentals, thirteen UCI Continental teams and three UCI Continental teams.

Stages

Prologue
14 August 2018 — Siófok,

Stage 1
15 August 2018 — Balatonalmádi to Keszthely,

Stage 2
16 August 2018 — Velence to Székesfehérvár,

Stage 3
17 August 2018 — Cegléd to Hajdúszoboszló,

Stage 4
18 August 2018 — Karcag to Miskolc,

Stage 5
19 August 2018 — Kazincbarcika to Kazincbarcika,

Classification leadership table

Standings

General classification

Points classification

Mountains classification

Hungarian rider classification

Team classification

See also

 2018 in men's road cycling
 2018 in sports

References

External links

2018
Tour de Hongrie
Tour de Hongrie
Tour de Hongrie